Millwood is a rural community in the central east part of the Riverina.  It is situated by road, about 6 kilometres south east from Currawarna and 26 kilometres south from Coolamon.

Millwood Post Office opened on 20 September 1898 and closed in 1918.

Gallery

Notes and references

Towns in the Riverina
Towns in New South Wales